Île du Port is one of the Kerguelen Islands in the southern Indian Ocean, situated in the Golfe des Baleiniers off the north coast of Grande Terre, the main island.

It is the fourth largest island in the archipelago (43 km2). The highest point is an inactive volcano named K13, at 340 metres.

References 

 André Giret, Dominique Weis, Michel Grégoire, Nadine Matielli, Bertrand Moine, Gilbert Michon, James Scoates, Sylvie Tourpin, Guillaume Delpech, Marie-Christine Gerbe, Sonia Doucet, Raynald Ethien et Jean-Yves Cotin « L'archipel de Kerguelen : les plus vieilles îles dans le plus jeune océan », Géologues, 2003, n°137, p. 15-23
 Jean-Louis Chapuis, Yves Frenot et Marc Lebouvier, « Une gamme d'îles de références, un atout majeur pour l'évaluation des programmes de restauration dans l'archipel de Kerguelen », Rev. Écol. (Terre Vie), supplément 9, 2002.

Port